In New York may refer to:
In New York (Ravi Shankar album), 1968 American release
In New York (Steve Grossman album), 1991 American release also with McCoy Tyner Trio

See also
 The Cannonball Adderley Sextet in New York, a live album of 1962